The Department of Jobs, Skills, Industry and Regions (DJSIR) is a department in the state of Victoria, Australia. Commencing operation on 1 January 2023, it was created in machinery of government changes following the return of the Labor government led by Premier Daniel Andrews at the 2022 state election, in which the department was renamed from the Department of Jobs, Precincts and Regions.

The DJSIR supports nine ministers across 15 portfolios, broadly related to economic development. It has the same responsibilities as the previous Department of Jobs, Precincts and Regions, with the exception of resources and agriculture which were transferred to the Department of Energy, Environment and Climate Action and local government which was transferred to Department of Government Services. Responsibilities for TAFE, skills, training and higher education were also transferred from the Department of Education and Training to the new department.

Ministers
, the DJSIR supports nine ministers in the following portfolios:

Structure
The DJSIR is divided into seven streams:
Industry and innovation
Employment and small business
Regional and suburban development
Training, skills and higher education
Sport, tourism and events
Strategy and priority events
Corporate services

Functions
The DJSIR has responsibility for the following policy areas:
 Economic development
 Industry
 Creative industries
 Employment
 Major events and tourism
 Industrial relations
 Regional development
 Small business
 Racing
 Sport and recreation 
 Suburban development
 Trade and investment
 Vocational education and training
 Higher education
 Provider registration and qualifications

References

External links

Organisational chart (Jan 2023)

Jobs, Skills, Industry and Regions
Ministries established in 2023
Economy of Victoria (Australia)
2023 establishments in Australia
Victoria
Victoria
Victoria
Victoria